Alfred the Great is a 1969 British epic film which portrays Alfred the Great's struggle to defend the Anglo-Saxon Kingdom of Wessex from a Danish Viking invasion in the 9th century. David Hemmings starred in the title role.

Plot
When the Vikings invade England, Alfred (David Hemmings) is about to take his priesthood vows. However, his brother, King Æthelred of Wessex (Alan Dobie), summons him to his aid and Alfred leaves for battle, where he appears to be a great tactician. Æthelred dies shortly after Alfred marries the Mercian princess Aelhswith (Prunella Ransome). Torn between following intellect or passion, Alfred at first refuses to succeed Æthelred and consummate his marriage, but is forced to accept kingship after the Danes attack again.

Realising the weak position of Wessex, Alfred goes into negotiations with Guthrum (Michael York), the Danish Viking leader of the Kingdom of East Anglia. Aelhswith on the other hand agrees to become Guthrum's hostage and they start to develop feelings for each other.

Alfred has difficulty acting like a king, calling for obedience and egalitarianism in the Medieval society of three estates, which the fighting nobility does not appreciate. The cleric Asser (Colin Blakely) warns him that he is too proud and, later, the Danes defeat Alfred. The latter is forced to retreat to the fens of Somerset. Roger's bandits, who take Alfred in, are more loyal to Alfred than his noblemen.

The nobles, however, drop their regicide plans and support Alfred in the climactic Battle of Athelney. Roger (Ian McKellen) sees that Alfred will need help and as the battle rages he arrives with monks, old men and peasant women, armed with clubs and pitchforks. Alfred defeats Guthrum, knocking him out, but decides to spare his life and forgives Aelhswith.

Cast
David Hemmings as Alfred the Great
Michael York as Guthrum
Prunella Ransome as Aelhswith
Colin Blakely as Asser
Ian McKellen as Roger
Peter Vaughan as Burrud
Alan Dobie as Ethelred of Wessex
Julian Glover as Athelstan
Vivien Merchant as Freda
Julian Chagrin as Ivar the Boneless
Jim Norton as Thanet
Christopher Timothy as Cedric
Sinéad Cusack as Edith
Barry Evans as Ingild
Peter Blythe as Eafa
Michael Billington as Offa
Robin Askwith as Shepherd Boy

Production

Development
Producer Bernie Smith says he became interested in Alfred the Great after reading about him in Winston Churchill's History of the English Speaking Peoples.

The film was announced in March 1964 as A King Is Born. It was "suggested" by a novel by Eleanor Shipley Duckett from a script by James R. Webb, who had written How the West Was Won for Smith. Filming was to take place in Ireland, with MGM financing. However, it took a number of years for the film to be made. Peter O'Toole was mentioned as a possible lead. In February 1967, the lead role was given to David Hemmings, who had appeared in MGM's Blowup.

Smith said he "wanted a director who had never done a historical. That way I knew we could minimise cliches and the possibility of someone simply repeating, imitating what went before." Clive Donner, then best known for What's New Pussycat?, was hired in September 1967, and Michael Killanin became associate producer. Donner said he wanted to make the film "because of the inherent youth problem which is so close to our so-called youth revolt; turning the destructiveness of youth into constructiveness. Like so many students today, he [Alfred] advocated peace, but at the same time proclaimed violence in order to redo the world."

Filming
The film was shot in County Galway, Ireland, including locations such as Castle Hackett in Tuam, Kilchreest, Ross Lake, and Cnoc Meadha.

Many resources went into replicating the 9th century AD, turning parts of County Galway into Wessex. This included a 200-foot-long hill figure of a white horse near Cnoc Meadha, representing the Uffington White Horse in Berkshire. Members of the Irish military served as extras during the battle scenes filmed in Counties Galway and Westmeath.

Mary J. Murphy discussed the film's production and reasons for its flopping in the 2008 book Viking Summer, the filming of Alfred the Great in Galway in 1968.

See also
List of historical drama films

References

External links 
 
 
 Alfred the Great at TCMDB

1969 films
1960s historical films
1960s biographical films
British biographical films
British war films
British epic films
British historical films
1960s English-language films
Cultural depictions of Alfred the Great
Cultural depictions of Ivar the Boneless
Films set in the Viking Age
Films set in the 9th century
Films shot in Hertfordshire
Films set in Somerset
Films shot in the Republic of Ireland
Metro-Goldwyn-Mayer films
Films directed by Clive Donner
1969 war films
Films shot at MGM-British Studios
1960s British films